The following is a list of all 2400 species in the flowering plant genus Piper which are recognised by Plants of the World Online .

A

 Piper abajoense Bornst.
 Piper abalienatum Trel.
 Piper abbadianum Yunck.
 Piper abbreviatum Opiz
 Piper abellinum Trel. & Yunck.
 Piper aberrans C.DC.
 Piper abutiloides (Kunth) Kunth ex Steud.
 Piper achoteanum Trel.
 Piper achotense Trel. & Yunck.
 Piper achromatolepis Trel.
 Piper achupallasense Yunck.
 Piper acre Blume
 Piper actae Trel.
 Piper acutamentum C.DC.
 Piper acutibracteum C.DC.
 Piper acutifolium Ruiz & Pav.
 Piper acutilimbum C.DC.
 Piper acutissimum Trel.
 Piper acutistigmum C.DC.
 Piper acutistipulum C.DC.
 Piper acutiusculum C.DC.
 Piper acutulum Trel.
 Piper adamatum Trel. & Standl.
 Piper addisonii Yunck.
 Piper adenandrum (Miq.) C.DC.
 Piper adenophlebium Trel.
 Piper admirabile Yunck.
 Piper adreptum Trel.
 Piper aduncum L.
 Piper aequale Vahl
 Piper aereum Trel.
 Piper aeruginosibaccum Trel.
 Piper affectans Trel.
 Piper affictum Trel.
 Piper afflictum Trel.
 Piper agellifolium Trel. & Yunck.
 Piper aghaense E.F.Guim. & Carv.-Silva
 Piper agostiniorum Steyerm.
 Piper aguacalientis Trel.
 Piper aguadulcense Yunck.
 Piper agusanense C.DC.
 Piper ailigandiense Callejas
 Piper alajuelanum Trel.
 Piper alatabaccum Trel. & Yunck.
 Piper alatipetiolatum Yunck.
 Piper albamentum C.DC.
 Piper albanense Yunck.
 Piper albiciliatum Yunck.
 Piper albidiflorum C.DC.
 Piper albidistigmatum C.DC.
 Piper albidum Kunth
 Piper albogranulatum Trel.
 Piper albomaculatum D.Dietr.
 Piper albopapillatum Trel.
 Piper albopilosum Yunck.
 Piper albopunctatum C.DC.
 Piper albopunctulatissimum Trel.
 Piper albozonatum C.DC.
 Piper albuginiferum Trel.
 Piper alexii Callejas
 Piper aleyreanum C.DC.
 Piper allardii Yunck.
 Piper allatum Trel.
 Piper allisum Trel.
 Piper alnoides (Kunth) Kunth ex Steud.
 Piper altevaginans Trel.
 Piper alushii Callejas
 Piper alveolatum Opiz
 Piper amalago L.
 Piper amoenum Yunck.
 Piper amparoense Yunck.
 Piper amphibium Trel.
 Piper amphioxys Trel.
 Piper amphitrichum Trel.
 Piper amphoricarpum Trel.
 Piper amplectenticaule Trel. & Yunck.
 Piper amplum (Kunth) Steud.
 Piper anastylum Trel.
 Piper andakiensis W.Trujillo-C. & Callejas
 Piper andreanum C.DC.
 Piper andresense Trel.
 Piper androgynum C.DC.
 Piper angamarcanum Sodiro ex C.DC.
 Piper angsiense I.M.Turner
 Piper angustifolium Lam.
 Piper angustipeltatum Merr.
 Piper anisophyllum Trel.
 Piper anisopleurum C.DC.
 Piper anisotis Hook.f.
 Piper anisotrichum C.DC.
 Piper anisum (Spreng.) Angely
 Piper annulatispicum Trel. & Yunck.
 Piper anonifolium (Kunth) Steud.
 Piper anonymum Trel.
 Piper anostachyum Yunck.
 Piper antherisobovatum Callejas
 Piper antioquiense C.DC.
 Piper antonense Callejas
 Piper apertum Trel.
 Piper apodum Trel.
 Piper appendiculatum (Benth.) C.DC.
 Piper apurimacanum Trel.
 Piper apus Trel.
 Piper aramanum C.DC.
 Piper araneatum Trel.
 Piper araquei Yunck.
 Piper arbelaezii Trel. & Yunck.
 Piper arboreum Aubl.
 Piper arborigaudens C.DC.
 Piper arborioccupans Trel. ex Callejas
 Piper arcessitum Trel.
 Piper archeri Trel. & Yunck.
 Piper arcteacuminatum Trel.
 Piper arcuatum Blume
 Piper arduum Trel.
 Piper arenicola Trel.
 Piper areolatum (Miq.) C.DC.
 Piper arfakianum C.DC.
 Piper argentamentum Trel. & Yunck.
 Piper argyrites Ridl. ex C.DC.
 Piper argyroneurum Hallier f.
 Piper argyrophyllum Miq.
 Piper arieianum C.DC.
 Piper aristolochiphyllum Quisumb.
 Piper armatum Trel. & Yunck.
 Piper aromaticaule Callejas
 Piper arrectispicum Trel.
 Piper arreptum Trel.
 Piper artanthe C.DC.
 Piper artanthopse C.DC.
 Piper articulatum A.Rich.
 Piper arunachalense Gajurel, Rethy & Y.Kumar
 Piper arundinetorum Trel.
 Piper ascendentispicum Trel.
 Piper asclepiadifolium Trel.
 Piper aserrianum Trel.
 Piper aspericaule Trel.
 Piper asperilimbum C.DC.
 Piper asperiusculum Kunth
 Piper asperulibaccum C.DC.
 Piper asplundii Yunck.
 Piper asterocarpum Trel.
 Piper asterostigmum Quisumb.
 Piper asterotrichum C.DC.
 Piper asymmetricum C.DC.
 Piper atlantidanum Trel.
 Piper atrichopus Trel.
 Piper atrobaccum Trel. & Yunck.
 Piper atroglandulosum Tebbs
 Piper atropremnon Trel.
 Piper attenuatamentum Trel.
 Piper attenuatum Buch.-Ham. ex Miq.
 Piper augustum Rudge
 Piper aulacospermum Callejas
 Piper auriculiferum Trel.
 Piper auriculilaminum Yunck.
 Piper aurilimbum C.DC.
 Piper auritifolium Trel.
 Piper auritum Kunth
 Piper aurorubrum C.DC.
 Piper austini Trel.
 Piper austrocaledonicum C.DC.
 Piper austromexicanum Trel.
 Piper austrosinense Y.C.Tseng
 Piper avanum Wall.
 Piper avellanum (Miq.) C.DC.
 Piper azuaiense Yunck.
 Piper azupizuanum Trel.

B

 Piper baccans (Miq.) C.DC.
 Piper baccatum Blume
 Piper baculiferum Trel.
 Piper baezanum Sodiro ex C.DC.
 Piper baezense Trel.
 Piper baguionum C.DC.
 Piper bahianum Yunck.
 Piper bajanum Trel. & Yunck.
 Piper bakeri C.DC. ex Callejas
 Piper bakerianum C.DC.
 Piper balansae C.DC.
 Piper balsapuertanum Trel.
 Piper bambusifolium Y.C.Tseng
 Piper bangii C.DC.
 Piper bangkanum C.DC.
 Piper bantamense Blume
 Piper baracoanum León
 Piper baramense C.DC.
 Piper barbatum Kunth
 Piper barberi Gamble
 Piper barbicuspe Trel.
 Piper barbinerve Trel.
 Piper barbirostre Trel.
 Piper barbispicum C.DC.
 Piper barbosanum Trel. & Yunck.
 Piper barbulantherum Trel.
 Piper barbulatum C.DC.
 Piper barcoense Yunck.
 Piper barkleyi Yunck.
 Piper barretoi Yunck.
 Piper barriosense Trel. & Standl.
 Piper bartlingianum (Miq.) C.DC.
 Piper basegibbosum Callejas
 Piper basilobatum Trel. & Yunck.
 Piper batuanum C.DC.
 Piper beccarii C.DC.
 Piper begoniicolor Trel. & Yunck.
 Piper begoniifolium Hook. & Arn.
 Piper begoniiforme Yunck.
 Piper belicense Callejas
 Piper bellidifolium Yunck.
 Piper belloi Yunck.
 Piper bellum Yunck.
 Piper belterraense Yunck.
 Piper bengalense C.DC.
 Piper bennettianum C.DC.
 Piper berembunense Chaveer. & Sudmoon
 Piper berlandieri C.DC.
 Piper bermejanum Trel. & Yunck.
 Piper bernoullii C.DC. ex Callejas
 Piper berryi Steyerm.
 Piper betle L.
 Piper betleoides C.DC.
 Piper betloides Chaveer. & Tanomtong
 Piper biauritum C.DC.
 Piper bicorne Carv.-Silva, E.F.Guim. & L.A.Pereira
 Piper bikanum O.Schwartz
 Piper bilobulatum C.DC.
 Piper bipedale C.DC.
 Piper bipunctatum C.DC.
 Piper biritak Trel. & Standl.
 Piper bisasperatum Trel.
 Piper biseriatum C.DC.
 Piper bistigmatum C.DC.
 Piper blattarum Spreng.
 Piper blepharilepidum Trel.
 Piper boehmeriifolium (Miq.) Wall. ex C.DC.
 Piper boissierianum C.DC.
 Piper boivinii C.DC.
 Piper bojonyum C.DC.
 Piper bolanicum Schltr. ex R.O.Gardner
 Piper bolivaranum Yunck.
 Piper bolivianum C.DC.
 Piper bonii C.DC.
 Piper boorsroae C.DC.
 Piper boqueronense Callejas
 Piper boquetense Yunck.
 Piper boquianum Trel. & Yunck.
 Piper borbonense (Miq.) C.DC.
 Piper borneense N.E.Br.
 Piper bosnicanum C.DC.
 Piper botrytes Vahl
 Piper bourgeaui C.DC.
 Piper bowiei Yunck.
 Piper brachipilum Yunck.
 Piper brachistopodum C.DC.
 Piper brachypetiolatum Yunck.
 Piper brachypodon (Benth.) C.DC.
 Piper brachypus Trel.
 Piper brachystylum Trel.
 Piper brachytrichum Trel.
 Piper bradei Yunck.
 Piper brassii Trel.
 Piper bredemeyeri J.Jacq.
 Piper breedlovei Callejas
 Piper brenesii C.DC.
 Piper breve C.DC.
 Piper brevesanum Yunck.
 Piper breviamentum C.DC.
 Piper brevicuspe (Miq.) Merr.
 Piper brevifolium C.DC.
 Piper brevilimbum C.DC.
 Piper brevipedicellatum Bornst.
 Piper brevipedunculatum C.DC.
 Piper brevipes C.DC.
 Piper brevispicum C.DC.
 Piper brevistigmum C.DC.
 Piper brevistrigillosum Trel.
 Piper brevistylum C.DC.
 Piper brewsteri Callejas
 Piper brisasense Yunck.
 Piper brongniartii (Miq.) C.DC.
 Piper brownsbergense Yunck.
 Piper bryogetum C.DC.
 Piper buchii Urb.
 Piper buchingeri C.DC. ex Callejas
 Piper bullatifolium Sodiro
 Piper bullatilimbum Pilg.
 Piper bullosum C.DC.
 Piper bullulatum M.A.Jaram.
 Piper bullulifolium Trel.
 Piper burenii C.DC.
 Piper burgeri Callejas
 Piper burkillii Ridl.
 Piper buruanum Miq.

C

 Piper cabagranum C.DC.
 Piper caballetense R.Bernal
 Piper caballo-cochanum Trel.
 Piper cabralanum C.DC.
 Piper cachimboense Yunck.
 Piper cacuminum C.DC.
 Piper cadenaense Tebbs
 Piper caducibracteum C.DC.
 Piper cajamarcanum Yunck.
 Piper cajambrense Trel. & Yunck.
 Piper caladiifolium (Miq.) C.DC.
 Piper calamistratum Trel.
 Piper calanyanum Trel. & Yunck.
 Piper calcaratum C.DC.
 Piper calcariforme Tebbs
 Piper calceolarium C.DC.
 Piper caldasianum (Miq.) Yunck.
 Piper caldense C.DC.
 Piper calderonii Trel. ex Callejas
 Piper caliendriferum Trel.
 Piper callcanense Trel.
 Piper callibracteum C.DC.
 Piper callosum Ruiz & Pav.
 Piper calocoma (Miq.) C.DC.
 Piper calophyllum C.DC.
 Piper calvarii S.M.Niño & Dorr
 Piper calvescens Trel.
 Piper calvescentinerve Trel.
 Piper calvibaccum Trel.
 Piper calvilimbum C.DC.
 Piper calvirameum C.DC.
 Piper cambessedesii (Miq.) C.DC.
 Piper cambodianum C.DC.
 Piper camiloi Yunck.
 Piper campanum Yunck.
 Piper camphoriferum C.DC.
 Piper campii Yunck.
 Piper camptostachys Urb.
 Piper canaense Standl.
 Piper canaliculum Tebbs
 Piper canastrense E.F.Guim. & Carv.-Silva
 Piper canavillosum Steyerm.
 Piper candelarianum C.DC.
 Piper candollei Sodiro
 Piper canescens J.Mathew
 Piper canovillosum Steyerm.
 Piper capacibracteum Trel.
 Piper capense L.f.
 Piper capillipes Trel. & Yunck.
 Piper capillistipes Trel.
 Piper capitarianum Yunck.
 Piper capitellatum C.DC.
 Piper captum Trel.
 Piper caquetanum Yunck.
 Piper caracolanum C.DC.
 Piper caranoense W.Trujillo-C.
 Piper cararense Trel. & Yunck.
 Piper carautensei E.F.Guim. & Carv.-Silva
 Piper carizalanum C.DC.
 Piper carlosii Trel. & Yunck.
 Piper carminis Trel.
 Piper carnibracteum C.DC.
 Piper carniconnectivum C.DC.
 Piper carnistigmum C.DC.
 Piper carpinteranum C.DC.
 Piper carpunya Ruiz & Pav.
 Piper carrapanum Trel.
 Piper carrilloanum C.DC.
 Piper cartagoanum C.DC.
 Piper casapiense (Miq.) C.DC.
 Piper casimirianum Hemsl.
 Piper cassinoides Opiz
 Piper casteloense Yunck.
 Piper castroanum Trel. & Yunck.
 Piper cataractarum Trel.
 Piper cathayanum M.G.Gilbert & N.H.Xia
 Piper cativalense Trel.
 Piper catripense Yunck.
 Piper caucaense Yunck.
 Piper caudatifolium Trel.
 Piper cavalcantei Yunck.
 Piper cavendishioides Trel. & Yunck.
 Piper cayoense Trel.
 Piper ceanothifolium Kunth
 Piper ceibense C.DC.
 Piper cejanum Trel. & Yunck.
 Piper celebicum Blume
 Piper celer Trel.
 Piper celsum Trel.
 Piper celtidiforme Opiz
 Piper cenocladum C.DC.
 Piper centroense Trel. & Yunck.
 Piper ceramicum (Miq.) C.DC.
 Piper cercidiphyllum Trel.
 Piper cernuum Vell.
 Piper cerrocampanum Callejas
 Piper cerronianum Steyerm.
 Piper certeguiense Trel. & Yunck.
 Piper chacaritaense Callejas
 Piper chagresianum Trel.
 Piper chalhuapuquianum Trel.
 Piper chamissonis (Miq.) Steud.
 Piper chanchamayanum Trel.
 Piper chanekii Trel.
 Piper changuinolanum Trel.
 Piper chantaranothaii Suwanph. & D.A.Simpson
 Piper chavicoides (Miq.) C.DC.
 Piper cheyennense Trel. & Standl.
 Piper chiadoense Yunck.
 Piper chiangdaoense Suwanph. & Chantar.
 Piper chiapasense Callejas
 Piper chimborazoense Yunck.
 Piper chimonanthifolium (Kunth) Kunth ex Steud.
 Piper chinantlense M.Martens & Galeotti
 Piper chinense Miq.
 Piper chiquihuitense Trel. & Standl.
 Piper chiriquinum C.DC.
 Piper chirripoense C.DC.
 Piper chlorostachyum C.DC.
 Piper choapamense Trel. ex Callejas
 Piper christyi C.DC.
 Piper chromatolepis Trel.
 Piper chrysoneurum Trel.
 Piper chrysostachyum C.DC.
 Piper chuarense M.A.Jaram. & Callejas
 Piper chumboense Yunck.
 Piper churruyacoanum Trel. & Yunck.
 Piper churumayu Ruiz & Pav.
 Piper cicatriculosum Trel. & Yunck.
 Piper cihuatlanense Bornst.
 Piper ciliatifolium Trel.
 Piper cilibracteum C.DC.
 Piper cililimbum Yunck.
 Piper ciliomarginatum Görts & Christenh.
 Piper cincinnatum Trel.
 Piper cinereocaule C.DC.
 Piper cinereum C.DC.
 Piper cingens C.DC.
 Piper ciniflonis Trel.
 Piper circumspectantis Trel.
 Piper cirratum Trel.
 Piper cisnerosense Trel. & Yunck.
 Piper cispontinum Trel.
 Piper claseanum Bornst.
 Piper clathratum Sodiro ex C.DC.
 Piper claudii C.DC.
 Piper claussenianum (Miq.) C.DC.
 Piper clavibracteum C.DC.
 Piper clavuligerum Trel.
 Piper clivicola Standl. & L.O.Williams
 Piper clypeatum Wall. ex Hook.f.
 Piper coactile Ridl.
 Piper coactipilum Trel.
 Piper coactoris Trel.
 Piper coariense Yunck.
 Piper cobanense Trel.
 Piper cobarianum Trel. & Yunck.
 Piper coccoloboides (Kunth) Kunth ex Steud.
 Piper cochleatum Sodiro
 Piper coclense Callejas
 Piper cocornanum Trel. & Yunck.
 Piper cocquericotense Trel.
 Piper coeloneurum Diels
 Piper coilostachyum C.DC.
 Piper colaphitolerans Trel.
 Piper colipanum C.DC.
 Piper colligatispicum Trel. & Yunck.
 Piper collinum C.DC.
 Piper colonense C.DC.
 Piper colotlipanense Bornst.
 Piper colubrinum Link
 Piper comasense Trel.
 Piper comatum Trel.
 Piper comayaguanum Trel.
 Piper come Trel. & Standl.
 Piper commutatum Steud.
 Piper compactum Trel.
 Piper concepcionis Trel.
 Piper concinnifolium Trel.
 Piper concretiflorum C.DC.
 Piper conditum Trel.
 Piper condotoense Trel. & Yunck.
 Piper conejoense Trel. & Yunck.
 Piper confertinodum (Trel. & Yunck.) M.A.Jaram. & Callejas
 Piper confusionis Trel.
 Piper confusum C.DC.
 Piper conibaccum C.DC.
 Piper conispicum Trel.
 Piper coniunctonis Callejas
 Piper conquistanum Yunck.
 Piper consanguineum (Kunth) Steud.
 Piper constanzanum (C.DC.) Urb.
 Piper contraverrugosum (Cuatrec.) R.Bernal
 Piper controversum Steud.
 Piper conversum Trel.
 Piper cooperi Yunck.
 Piper copacabanense Trel.
 Piper copeyanum (C.DC.) Trel.
 Piper coralfalgense C.DC.
 Piper corcovadense (Miq.) C.DC.
 Piper cordatilimbum Quisumb.
 Piper cordatum C.DC.
 Piper cordiforme Steyerm.
 Piper cordilimbum C.DC.
 Piper cordillerianum C.DC.
 Piper cordoncillo Trel.
 Piper cordovanum C.DC.
 Piper corei (Yunck.) R.Bernal
 Piper coriaceilimbum C.DC.
 Piper corintoananum Yunck.
 Piper cornifolium Kunth
 Piper cornilimbum C.DC.
 Piper coronanum Trel. & Standl.
 Piper coronatibracteum Trel.
 Piper corozalanum Trel.
 Piper corpulentispicum Trel. & Yunck.
 Piper corrugatum Kuntze
 Piper coruscans Kunth
 Piper corylistachyopsis Trel.
 Piper costaricense C.DC.
 Piper costatum C.DC.
 Piper costulatum C.DC.
 Piper courtallense P.K.Mukh.
 Piper cowanii (Yunck.) Yunck.
 Piper coyolesense Trel.
 Piper crassicaule Trel.
 Piper crassinervium Kunth
 Piper crassipedunculum Yunck.
 Piper crassipes Korth. ex Miq.
 Piper crassistilum Yunck.
 Piper crassum Blume
 Piper crebrinodum C.DC.
 Piper crenatifolium Trel. & Yunck.
 Piper crenulatibracteum C.DC.
 Piper crenulatum Steyerm.
 Piper cricamolense Trel.
 Piper criniovarium Yunck.
 Piper crispatum A.C.Sm.
 Piper cristalinanum Trel. & Yunck.
 Piper cristicola Trel.
 Piper cristinanum Trel. & Standl.
 Piper crocatum Ruiz & Pav.
 Piper cuasianum Standl.
 Piper cuatrecasasii (Trel. & Yunck.) R.Bernal
 Piper cubataonum C.DC.
 Piper cubeba L.f.
 Piper cubilquitzianum C.DC.
 Piper cucullatum Callejas
 Piper cufodontii Trel.
 Piper culebranum C.DC.
 Piper cumanense Kunth
 Piper cumaralense C.DC.
 Piper cumbasonum C.DC.
 Piper cumbotianum C.DC.
 Piper cuniculorum Trel. & Yunck.
 Piper cunninghamii Yunck.
 Piper cupreatum Trel.
 Piper curridabatanum Trel.
 Piper curtifolium C.DC.
 Piper curtilimbum C.DC.
 Piper curtipetiolum C.DC.
 Piper curtirachis W.C.Burger
 Piper curtisii C.DC.
 Piper curtispicum C.DC.
 Piper curtistilum C.DC.
 Piper curtistipes C.DC.
 Piper curvatipes Trel.
 Piper curvatum Ruiz & Pav.
 Piper curvinervium Callejas & Betancur
 Piper curvipilum Trel.
 Piper cuspidatum Desv.
 Piper cuspidibracteatum Yunck.
 Piper cuspidiflorum Callejas
 Piper cuspidilimbum C.DC.
 Piper cuspidispicum Trel.
 Piper cutucuense Yunck.
 Piper cuyabanum C.DC.
 Piper cuyunianum Steyerm.
 Piper cyanophyllum Trel.
 Piper cyphophyllopse Trel. & Yunck.
 Piper cyphophyllum C.DC.
 Piper cyprium Trel. & Yunck.
 Piper cyrtopodum (Miq.) C.DC.
 Piper cyrtostachys Ridl.

D

 Piper dactylostigmum Yunck.
 Piper daedalum Trel.
 Piper daguanum C.DC.
 Piper damiaoshanense Y.C.Tseng
 Piper daniel-gonzalezii Trel.
 Piper darienense C.DC.
 Piper dasyoura (Miq.) C.DC.
 Piper dasypodum (Miq.) C.DC.
 Piper dasypogon C.DC.
 Piper davaoense C.DC.
 Piper davidianum C.DC.
 Piper davidsoniae Yunck.
 Piper dawsonii Trel.
 Piper deamii Trel.
 Piper decipiens (Miq.) C.DC.
 Piper decrescens (Miq.) C.DC.
 Piper decumanum L.
 Piper decurrens C.DC.
 Piper decurtispicum (Trel. & Yunck.) Callejas
 Piper dedititium Trel.
 Piper deductum Trel.
 Piper deflexispicum Trel.
 Piper degeneri A.C.Sm.
 Piper delectans Trel.
 Piper delicatum C.DC.
 Piper deliciasanum Steyerm.
 Piper delirioi Sarnaglia & E.F.Guim.
 Piper deltoideocarpum Trel.
 Piper demeraranum (Miq.) C.DC.
 Piper demoratum Trel.
 Piper dempoanum C.DC.
 Piper dendroamans Trel. ex Callejas
 Piper dennisii Trel.
 Piper densiciliatum Yunck.
 Piper denudatissimum Callejas
 Piper depressibaccum Trel.
 Piper descourtilsianum C.DC.
 Piper desultorium Trel.
 Piper detonsum Trel.
 Piper diazanum Trel.
 Piper dichotomum Ruiz & Pav.
 Piper dichroostachyum Trel. & Yunck.
 Piper diffamatum Trel. & Yunck.
 Piper diffundum Yunck.
 Piper diffusum Vahl
 Piper diguaense Yunck.
 Piper dilatatum Rich.
 Piper dimetrale C.DC.
 Piper dimorphophyllum Trel.
 Piper dimorphotrichum Yunck.
 Piper dimorphum Callejas
 Piper dindingsianum C.DC.
 Piper diospyrifolium (Kunth) Kunth ex Steud.
 Piper dipterocarpinum C.DC.
 Piper diquisanum C.DC.
 Piper discriminatum Trel. & Yunck.
 Piper disparifolium Trel.
 Piper disparinervium Callejas
 Piper disparipes Trel.
 Piper disparipilum C.DC.
 Piper dissimulans Trel.
 Piper distichum Trel. & Yunck.
 Piper distigmatum Yunck.
 Piper divaricatum G.Mey.
 Piper diversipilum Trel.
 Piper divortans Trel. & Yunck.
 Piper divulgatum Trel. & Yunck.
 Piper djabia C.DC.
 Piper dodsonii Yunck.
 Piper doiphukhaense Suwanph. & Chantar.
 Piper dolichostachyum M.G.Gilbert & N.H.Xia
 Piper dolichostylum Callejas & Betancur
 Piper dolichotrichum Yunck.
 Piper domingense C.DC.
 Piper donnell-smithii C.DC.
 Piper dotanum Trel.
 Piper douglasii Callejas
 Piper dravidii Lekhak, Kambale & S.R.Yadav
 Piper dryadum C.DC.
 Piper duartei E.F.Guim. & Carv.-Silva
 Piper duckei C.DC.
 Piper dukei Yunck.
 Piper dulce Trel.
 Piper dumeticola C.DC.
 Piper dumiformans C.DC.
 Piper dumosum Rudge
 Piper dunlapii Trel.
 Piper dunstervilleorum Steyerm.
 Piper durilignum C.DC.
 Piper durilimbum C.DC.
 Piper durionoides Suwanph. & Chantar.
 Piper durvilleanum (Miq.) Trel.
 Piper dussii C.DC.

E

 Piper ecallosum Trel.
 Piper echeverrianum Trel.
 Piper echinocaule Yunck.
 Piper echinovarium Yunck.
 Piper ecuadorense Sodiro
 Piper edurum Trel.
 Piper edwallii Yunck.
 Piper ejuncidum Trel.
 Piper elasmophyllum Trel.
 Piper elatostema Hallier f.
 Piper elbancoanum Trel. & Yunck.
 Piper elbertii C.DC.
 Piper elcaranyanum Trel. & Yunck.
 Piper eldoradense Trel. ex Callejas
 Piper ellipticifolium Yunck.
 Piper ellipticolanceolatum (C.DC.) Trel.
 Piper ellsworthii (Trel. & Yunck.) R.Bernal
 Piper elmeri Merr.
 Piper elongatum Vahl
 Piper elparamoense Yunck.
 Piper emancipationis Trel.
 Piper emmerichianum Yunck.
 Piper emollitum Trel.
 Piper emygdioi Yunck.
 Piper enckeaespicum (Trel. & Yunck.) Callejas
 Piper endlicherianum (Miq.) Trel.
 Piper enenyasense Trel.
 Piper enganyanum Trel. & Yunck.
 Piper ensifolium Quisumb.
 Piper entradense Trel. & Yunck.
 Piper epigynium C.DC.
 Piper epilosipes Trel.
 Piper epunctatum Trel.
 Piper erectamentum C.DC.
 Piper erecticaule C.DC.
 Piper erectipilum Yunck.
 Piper erectum C.DC.
 Piper eriocladum Sodiro
 Piper eriopodon (Miq.) C.DC.
 Piper erubescentispica Trel.
 Piper erythrostachyum C.DC.
 Piper erythroxyloides R.E.Schult. & García-Barr.
 Piper escaleranum C.DC.
 Piper escuadranum Trel.
 Piper esperancanum Yunck.
 Piper eucalyptifolium Rudge
 Piper eucalyptiphyllum C.DC.
 Piper eucalyptolimbum C.DC.
 Piper eupodum C.DC.
 Piper euryphyllum C.DC.
 Piper eustylum Diels
 Piper evasum Trel.
 Piper evingeri Yunck.
 Piper evulsipilosum Trel.
 Piper ewanii Yunck.
 Piper exactum Trel. & Standl.
 Piper exasperatum Vahl
 Piper excavatum Ruiz & Pav.
 Piper excelsum G.Forst.
 Piper excessum Trel.
 Piper exiguicaule Yunck.
 Piper exiguispicum Trel.
 Piper expolitum Trel.
 Piper externum Trel.

F

 Piper factum Trel.
 Piper fadyenii C.DC.
 Piper faecatum Trel.
 Piper fagifolium Trel.
 Piper falanense Trel. & Yunck.
 Piper falcifolium Trel.
 Piper falcigerum Trel.
 Piper falcispicum Yunck.
 Piper falconeri C.DC.
 Piper falculispicum Trel. & Yunck.
 Piper fallax Vahl
 Piper fallenii A.H.Gentry
 Piper fallens Trel.
 Piper fanshawei Yunck.
 Piper faroense Yunck.
 Piper fastiditum Trel. & Yunck.
 Piper faviculiferum Trel.
 Piper ferreyrae Yunck.
 Piper ferriei C.DC.
 Piper figlinum Trel.
 Piper filipedunculum C.DC.
 Piper filipes C.DC.
 Piper filiramosum Callejas
 Piper filistilum C.DC.
 Piper fimbrirachium Callejas
 Piper fimbriulatum C.DC.
 Piper firmifolium Trel.
 Piper firmolimbum C.DC.
 Piper fischerianum C.DC.
 Piper flagellicuspe Trel. & Yunck.
 Piper flavescens (C.DC.) Trel.
 Piper flavibaccum C.DC.
 Piper flavicans C.DC.
 Piper flavidum C.DC.
 Piper flavifructum Trel.
 Piper flaviramum C.DC.
 Piper flavispicum C.DC.
 Piper flavoviride C.DC.
 Piper flexuosum Rudge
 Piper fonteboanum Yunck.
 Piper foreroi A.H.Gentry
 Piper formici-tolerans Trel.
 Piper formosum (Miq.) C.DC.
 Piper forstenii C.DC.
 Piper fortalezanum Trel.
 Piper fortunaense Tebbs
 Piper fortunyoanum Trel.
 Piper fragile Benth.
 Piper fragiliforme C.DC.
 Piper fragrans Trel.
 Piper fraguanum Trel.
 Piper francovilleanum C.DC.
 Piper fresnoense Trel. & Yunck.
 Piper friedrichsthalii C.DC.
 Piper frioense Standl. & Steyerm.
 Piper froesii Yunck.
 Piper frostii Trel. ex Callejas
 Piper frustratum (Miq.) Boerl.
 Piper fuertesii C.DC.
 Piper fulgentifolium Yunck.
 Piper fulgidum Yunck.
 Piper fuligineum (Kunth) Steud.
 Piper fuliginosum Sodiro
 Piper fulvescenticaule Trel.
 Piper funckii C.DC.
 Piper fundacionense Steyerm.
 Piper fungiforme Spokes
 Piper fusagasuganum Trel. & Yunck.
 Piper fuscescentispicum C.DC.
 Piper fuscinervium Quisumb.
 Piper fuscispicum Trel.
 Piper fuscobracteatum Trel.
 Piper futuri Trel. & Yunck.

G

 Piper galeatum (Miq.) C.DC.
 Piper galicianum Steyerm.
 Piper gallatlyi C.DC.
 Piper gamboanum (C.DC.) C.DC.
 Piper garagaranum C.DC.
 Piper gatunense Trel.
 Piper gaudichaudianum (Kunth) Kunth ex Steud.
 Piper gaumeri Trel.
 Piper generalense Trel.
 Piper geniculatum Sw.
 Piper gentlei Trel.
 Piper gentryi Steyerm.
 Piper genuflexum Trel.
 Piper georginum Trel. & Standl.
 Piper gerardoi Callejas
 Piper gerritii Callejas
 Piper gibbiflorum C.DC.
 Piper gibbilimbum C.DC.
 Piper gibbosum C.DC.
 Piper gigas Trel.
 Piper gilvescens Trel.
 Piper gilvibaccum Trel.
 Piper giordanoi E.F.Guim. & D.Monteiro
 Piper glaberrimum C.DC.
 Piper glabratum (Kunth) Steud.
 Piper glabrescens (Miq.) C.DC.
 Piper glabribaccum Trel.
 Piper glabribracteum Yunck.
 Piper glabrifolium C.DC.
 Piper glabrius Trel.
 Piper glanduligerum C.DC.
 Piper glandulosissimum Yunck.
 Piper globulantherum C.DC.
 Piper globulistigmum C.DC.
 Piper goeldii C.DC.
 Piper goesii Yunck.
 Piper golfitoense Callejas
 Piper gonagricum Trel.
 Piper gonocarpum Trel.
 Piper gorgonillense Trel. & Yunck.
 Piper gracile Ruiz & Pav.
 Piper gracilipes C.DC.
 Piper graciliramosum Yunck.
 Piper gracillimum Trel.
 Piper graeffei Warb.
 Piper grande Vahl
 Piper grandilimbum C.DC.
 Piper grandispicum C.DC.
 Piper grantii Yunck.
 Piper granulatum Trel.
 Piper granuligerum Trel.
 Piper gratum Trel.
 Piper graveolens C.DC.
 Piper grayumii Callejas
 Piper griffithii C.DC.
 Piper griseocaule Trel.
 Piper griseolimbum Trel. & Yunck.
 Piper griseopubens Trel.
 Piper griseum C.DC.
 Piper guacimonum (C.DC.) Trel.
 Piper guahamense C.DC.
 Piper gualeanum Sodiro ex C.DC.
 Piper guanacostense C.DC.
 Piper guanahacabibense Borhidi
 Piper guapense Yunck.
 Piper guatemalense Callejas
 Piper guatopoense Yunck.
 Piper guazacapanense Trel. & Standl.
 Piper guedesii C.DC.
 Piper guianense (Klotzsch) C.DC.
 Piper guineense Schumach. & Thonn.
 Piper gurupanum Yunck.
 Piper gutierrezii Yunck.
 Piper gymnocladum C.DC.
 Piper gymnophyllum C.DC.

H

 Piper hainanense Hemsl.
 Piper halconense C.DC.
 Piper halesiifolium (Kunth) Kunth ex Steud.
 Piper hamiltonii C.DC.
 Piper hammelii Callejas
 Piper hancei Maxim.
 Piper harlingii Yunck.
 Piper harmandii C.DC.
 Piper hartii C.DC.
 Piper hartwegianum (Benth.) C.DC.
 Piper hassleri C.DC.
 Piper hatschbachii Yunck.
 Piper haughtii Trel. & Yunck.
 Piper havilandii C.DC.
 Piper hayneanum C.DC.
 Piper hebetifolium W.C.Burger
 Piper hederaceum (Miq.) C.DC.
 Piper heimii C.DC.
 Piper hemmendorffii C.DC.
 Piper heptandrum (Miq.) C.DC.
 Piper hermannii Trel. & Yunck.
 Piper hermes Trel. & Standl.
 Piper hermosanum Yunck.
 Piper herrerae Trel.
 Piper heterobracteum Steyerm.
 Piper heterocarpum Trel.
 Piper heterophyllum Ruiz & Pav.
 Piper heterotrichum C.DC.
 Piper heydei C.DC.
 Piper hians Trel.
 Piper hieronymi C.DC.
 Piper hillianum C.DC.
 Piper hippocrepiforme Steyerm.
 Piper hirtellipetiolum C.DC.
 Piper hirtilimbum Trel. & Yunck.
 Piper hirtovarium C.DC.
 Piper hispidiramum C.DC.
 Piper hispidiseptum Trel.
 Piper hispidum Sw.
 Piper hochiense Y.C.Tseng
 Piper hodgei Yunck.
 Piper hoehnei Yunck.
 Piper hoffmannseggianum Schult.
 Piper holdridgeanum W.C.Burger
 Piper holguinianum Trel.
 Piper hollrungii K.Schum. & Lauterb.
 Piper holstii Callejas
 Piper holtii Trel. & Yunck.
 Piper holtonii C.DC.
 Piper hondonadense Trel. & Yunck.
 Piper hongkongense C.DC.
 Piper hooglandii (I.Hutton & P.S.Green) M.A.Jaram.
 Piper hookeri Miq.
 Piper hookerianum (Miq.) C.DC.
 Piper hosei C.DC.
 Piper hosokawae Fosberg
 Piper hostmannianum (Miq.) C.DC.
 Piper huacachianum Trel.
 Piper huacapistanum Trel.
 Piper huallaganum Trel.
 Piper huantanum Trel.
 Piper huigranum Trel. & Yunck.
 Piper huilanum C.DC.
 Piper humaytanum Yunck.
 Piper humillimum C.DC.
 Piper humistratum Görts & K.U.Kramer
 Piper humoense Trel.
 Piper humorigaudens Trel.
 Piper hydrolapathum C.DC.
 Piper hylebates C.DC.
 Piper hylophilum C.DC.
 Piper hymenophyllum Miq.
 Piper hymenopodum Sodiro
 Piper hypoglaucum Miq.
 Piper hypoleucum Sodiro

I

 Piper ilheusense Yunck.
 Piper illautum Trel.
 Piper imberbe Trel. & Standl.
 Piper immite Trel.
 Piper immutatum Trel.
 Piper imparipes Trel.
 Piper imperiale (Miq.) C.DC.
 Piper imperspicuibracteum Trel.
 Piper impube Trel.
 Piper inaequale C.DC.
 Piper inauspicatum Trel.
 Piper inclemens Trel. & Yunck.
 Piper incomptum Trel.
 Piper indecorum (Kunth) Kunth ex Steud.
 Piper indianonum Trel.
 Piper indiciflexum Trel.
 Piper indicum C.DC.
 Piper indignum Trel.
 Piper infossibaccatum A.Huang
 Piper infossum Y.C.Tseng
 Piper infraluteum Trel.
 Piper inhorrescens Trel.
 Piper injucundum Trel.
 Piper insectifugum C.DC. ex Seem.
 Piper insignilaminum Trel. & Yunck.
 Piper insignilimbum C.DC.
 Piper insipiens Trel. & Yunck.
 Piper insolens Trel.
 Piper instabilipes Trel.
 Piper insulicola Trel.
 Piper interitum Trel.
 Piper internibaccum C.DC.
 Piper internovarium C.DC.
 Piper interruptum Opiz
 Piper intonsum Trel.
 Piper intramarginatum Callejas
 Piper iquitosense Trel.
 Piper irazuanum C.DC.
 Piper irrasum Trel.
 Piper itatiaianum C.DC.
 Piper itayanum Trel.
 Piper ivonense Yunck.
 Piper ixocubvainense Standl. & Steyerm.
 Piper ixtlanense Callejas

J

 Piper jaboncillanum Trel. & Yunck.
 Piper jacaleapaense Callejas
 Piper jacquemontianum (Kunth) Kunth ex Steud.
 Piper jactatum Trel. & Standl.
 Piper jalapense M.Martens & Galeotti
 Piper jaliscanum S.Watson
 Piper japurense (Miq.) C.DC.
 Piper japvonum C.DC.
 Piper jauaense Steyerm.
 Piper javariense Yunck.
 Piper javitense Kunth
 Piper jenkinsii C.DC.
 Piper jericoense Trel. & Yunck.
 Piper jianfenglingense C.Y.Hao & Y.H.Tan
 Piper josephii R.Bernal
 Piper jubatum Trel.
 Piper jubimarginatum Yunck.
 Piper julianii Callejas
 Piper juliflorum Nees & Mart.
 Piper jumayense Trel. & Standl.

K

 Piper kadsura (Choisy) Ohwi
 Piper kandavuense A.C.Sm.
 Piper kanehiranum Trel.
 Piper kantetulense Trel.
 Piper kapruanum C.DC.
 Piper karpuragandhum J.Mathew & Yohannan
 Piper karwinskianum (Kunth) Kunth ex Steud.
 Piper kawakamii Hayata
 Piper kelleyi Tepe
 Piper kerberi C.DC.
 Piper keyanum C.DC.
 Piper khaoyaiense Suwanph. & D.A.Simpson
 Piper khasianum C.DC.
 Piper killipii Trel.
 Piper kimpitirikianum Trel.
 Piper kleinii Yunck.
 Piper klossii Ridl.
 Piper klotzschianum (Kunth) C.DC.
 Piper klugianum Trel.
 Piper klugii Yunck.
 Piper kongkandanum Suwanph. & Chantar.
 Piper konkintoense Trel.
 Piper koordersii C.DC.
 Piper kotanum C.DC.
 Piper kreangense C.DC.
 Piper krintjingense C.DC.
 Piper krukoffii Yunck.
 Piper kuhlmannii Yunck.
 Piper kunstleri C.DC.
 Piper kunthii (Miq.) C.DC.
 Piper kurgianum P.K.Mukh.
 Piper kurzii Ridl.
 Piper kwashoense Hayata

L

 Piper labillardierei C.DC.
 Piper lacandonense Callejas
 Piper laceratibracteum Trel.
 Piper lacunosum Kunth
 Piper ladoradense Trel. & Yunck.
 Piper ladrillense Trel.
 Piper laedans Trel.
 Piper laetispicum C.DC.
 Piper laeve Vahl
 Piper laevibracteum Trel.
 Piper laevicarpum Yunck.
 Piper laevigatum Kunth
 Piper lagenibaccum Trel.
 Piper lagoaense C.DC.
 Piper laguna-cochanum Trel. & Yunck.
 Piper lagunaense Trel. & Yunck.
 Piper lainatakanum C.DC.
 Piper lamasense Trel.
 Piper lanatibracteum Trel.
 Piper lanatum Roxb.
 Piper lanceifolium Kunth
 Piper lanceolatum Ruiz & Pav.
 Piper lancetillanum Trel.
 Piper lanciferum Standl. & Steyerm.
 Piper lancilimbum Yunck.
 Piper landakanum C.DC.
 Piper langlassei C.DC.
 Piper lanosibracteum Trel.
 Piper lanosicaule Trel.
 Piper lanyuense K.N.Kung & Kun C.Chang
 Piper laosanum C.DC.
 Piper lapathifolium (Kunth) Steud.
 Piper larutanum C.DC.
 Piper lateoblongum S.Moore
 Piper lateovatum Trel.
 Piper laterifissum Trel.
 Piper lateripilosum Yunck.
 Piper latibracteum C.DC.
 Piper latifolium L.f.
 Piper laurifolium Mill.
 Piper laurinum Roem. & Schult.
 Piper lauterbachii C.DC.
 Piper lawrancei Trel. & Yunck.
 Piper laxivenum C.DC.
 Piper lechlerianum C.DC.
 Piper ledermannii C.DC.
 Piper lehmannianum C.DC.
 Piper lemaense Yunck.
 Piper lempirense Callejas
 Piper lenticellosum C.DC.
 Piper lepidotum D.Parodi
 Piper leptocladum C.DC.
 Piper leptoneuron C.DC.
 Piper leptostilum C.DC.
 Piper lepturum (Kunth) Kunth ex Steud.
 Piper lessertianum (Miq.) C.DC.
 Piper leticianum C.DC.
 Piper leucophaeocaule Trel.
 Piper leucophaeum Trel.
 Piper leucophlebium Trel.
 Piper leucophyllum (Miq.) C.DC.
 Piper leucostachyum Trel. & Yunck.
 Piper levilimbum Trel.
 Piper lhotzkyanum (Kunth) Kunth ex Steud.
 Piper liebmannii C.DC.
 Piper limae Yunck.
 Piper limosum Yunck.
 Piper lincolnense Trel.
 Piper lindbergii C.DC.
 Piper lindenianum C.DC.
 Piper lindenii (Miq.) C.DC.
 Piper linearifolium C.DC.
 Piper lineativillosum Trel. & Yunck.
 Piper lineatum Ruiz & Pav.
 Piper lineolatifolium Trel. & Yunck.
 Piper lingshuiense Y.C.Tseng
 Piper linguliforme Steyerm.
 Piper lippoldii Saralegui
 Piper littlei Yunck.
 Piper littorale C.DC.
 Piper llatanum Trel.
 Piper loefgrenii Yunck.
 Piper lonchites Schult.
 Piper longamentum C.DC.
 Piper longeacuminatum Trel.
 Piper longepetiolatum (C.DC.) Trel.
 Piper longestamineum Trel.
 Piper longestylosum C.DC.
 Piper longiappendiculatum Steyerm.
 Piper longiauriculatum Yunck.
 Piper longicaudatum Trel. & Yunck.
 Piper longicaule C.DC.
 Piper longichaetum Yunck.
 Piper longifilamentum C.DC.
 Piper longifolium Ruiz & Pav.
 Piper longimucronatum Yunck.
 Piper longipedicellatum Quisumb.
 Piper longipedunculatum C.DC.
 Piper longipes C.DC.
 Piper longipilosum C.DC.
 Piper longipilum C.DC.
 Piper longispicum C.DC.
 Piper longistigmum C.DC.
 Piper longistipulum C.DC.
 Piper longivaginans C.DC.
 Piper longum L.
 Piper loretoanum Trel.
 Piper losoense Trel. & Yunck.
 Piper lucigaudens C.DC.
 Piper lundellianum Trel.
 Piper lundellii Trel.
 Piper lundii C.DC.
 Piper lunulibracteatum C.DC.
 Piper lutescens C.DC.
 Piper luxii C.DC.

M

 Piper macapaense Yunck.
 Piper macbrideanum Trel.
 Piper macedoi Yunck.
 Piper macerispicum Trel. & Yunck.
 Piper machadoanum C.DC.
 Piper machoense Callejas
 Piper machucanum Trel.
 Piper machupicchuense Trel.
 Piper macrocarpum C.DC.
 Piper macropiper Pennant
 Piper macropodum C.DC.
 Piper macropunctatum Yunck.
 Piper macrorhynchon (Miq.) C.DC.
 Piper macrostylum C.DC.
 Piper macrotrichum C.DC.
 Piper macrourum Kunth
 Piper maculatum Blume
 Piper madagascariense (Miq.) C.DC.
 Piper madeiranum Yunck.
 Piper magen B.Q.Cheng ex C.L.Long & Jun Yang bis
 Piper magnantherum C.DC.
 Piper magnificum Gentil ex Trel.
 Piper magnifolium (C.DC.) Trel.
 Piper magnilimbum C.DC.
 Piper magnispicum C.DC.
 Piper maingayi Hook.f.
 Piper majense Callejas
 Piper majusculum Blume
 Piper makruense C.DC.
 Piper malacocarpum K.Schum. & Lauterb.
 Piper malacophyllum (C.Presl) C.DC.
 Piper malgassicum Papini, Palchetti, M.Gori & Rota Nodari
 Piper malifolium Trel.
 Piper mamorense Yunck.
 Piper manabinum C.DC.
 Piper mananthum C.Wright
 Piper manausense Yunck.
 Piper mansericheanum Trel.
 Piper manzanillanum C.DC.
 Piper mapirense C.DC.
 Piper maraccasense Trel.
 Piper maranyonense Trel.
 Piper marequitense C.DC.
 Piper margaretae Trel.
 Piper margaritatum Trel.
 Piper marginatum Jacq.
 Piper marginecontinuum Callejas
 Piper marsupiiferum Trel.
 Piper martensianum C.DC.
 Piper martinense Trel.
 Piper marturetense Trel. & Yunck.
 Piper massiei C.DC.
 Piper mastersianum C.DC.
 Piper matanganum C.DC.
 Piper matinanum C.DC.
 Piper matthewsii C.DC.
 Piper matudae Lundell
 Piper maxonii C.DC.
 Piper maxwellianum C.DC.
 Piper mayanum Lundell
 Piper mazamariense Yunck.
 Piper mcphersonii Callejas
 Piper mcvaughii Bornst.
 Piper medinaense Yunck.
 Piper medinillifolium Quisumb.
 Piper mediocre C.DC.
 Piper meeboldii C.DC.
 Piper megacarpum J.Mathew
 Piper melanocaulon Quisumb.
 Piper melanocladum C.DC.
 Piper melanopremnum Trel. & Ekman
 Piper melanostachyum C.DC.
 Piper melanostictum (Miq.) C.DC.
 Piper melastomoides Schltdl. & Cham.
 Piper melchior (Sykes) M.A.Jaram.
 Piper mellibracteum Trel.
 Piper membranaceum C.DC.
 Piper mendezense Yunck.
 Piper mercedense Trel.
 Piper mercens Yunck.
 Piper meritum Trel.
 Piper merrillii C.DC.
 Piper mestonii F.M.Bailey
 Piper metallicum Hallier f.
 Piper metanum Trel. & Yunck.
 Piper methysticum G.Forst.
 Piper mexiae Trel. & Yunck.
 Piper mexicanum (Miq.) C.DC.
 Piper michelianum C.DC.
 Piper micoense Trel.
 Piper micranthera C.DC.
 Piper microstigma (Miq.) C.DC.
 Piper microtrichum C.DC.
 Piper middlesexense Trel. ex Callejas
 Piper miersinum (Miq.) C.DC.
 Piper miguel-conejoanum Trel. & Yunck.
 Piper mikanianum (Kunth) Steud.
 Piper mikaniifolium Trel.
 Piper mikii M.Hiroe
 Piper milciadesii Trel. & Yunck.
 Piper millegranum Yunck.
 Piper millepunctulatum Trel. & Yunck.
 Piper minasarum Steyerm.
 Piper minutantherum C.DC.
 Piper minuteauriculatum Callejas
 Piper minutescabiosum Trel.
 Piper minutiflorum Callejas
 Piper minutistigmum C.DC.
 Piper miquelianum C.DC.
 Piper mischocarpum Y.C.Tseng
 Piper mishuyacuense Trel.
 Piper mite Ruiz & Pav.
 Piper mitifolium Trel.
 Piper mituense Trel. & Yunck.
 Piper mocco-mocco Trel.
 Piper mocoanum Trel. & Yunck.
 Piper moense C.DC.
 Piper mohomoho C.DC.
 Piper mollicomum Kunth ex Steud.
 Piper mollipilosum C.DC.
 Piper mollissimum Blume
 Piper molliusculum Sodiro
 Piper monagasense Yunck.
 Piper monostigmum C.DC.
 Piper montanum C.DC.
 Piper montealegreanum Yunck.
 Piper monteluctans Trel.
 Piper monteverdeanum C.DC.
 Piper monteverdense Callejas
 Piper montium C.DC.
 Piper montivagum Ridl.
 Piper monurum Trel. & Yunck.
 Piper monzonense C.DC.
 Piper moreletii C.DC.
 Piper morelianum Yunck.
 Piper morianum Trel.
 Piper morilloi Steyerm.
 Piper morisonianum C.DC.
 Piper mornicola C.DC.
 Piper mosaicum Steyerm.
 Piper moscopanense Yunck.
 Piper mosenii (Trel.) C.DC.
 Piper mourae Yunck.
 Piper moyobambanum Trel.
 Piper mucronatum C.DC.
 Piper mucronulatum Blume
 Piper muelleri C.DC.
 Piper multiforme Trel. & Yunck.
 Piper multimammosum Trel.
 Piper multinodum C.DC.
 Piper multiplinervium C.DC.
 Piper multistigmum C.DC.
 Piper multitudinis Trel.
 Piper muluense O.Schwartz
 Piper munchanum C.DC.
 Piper mundum Trel.
 Piper muneyporense C.DC.
 Piper munyanum Trel.
 Piper muricatum Blume
 Piper murrayanum C.DC.
 Piper musteum Trel.
 Piper mutabile C.DC.
 Piper mutisii Trel. & Yunck.
 Piper myrmecophilum C.DC.

N

 Piper nagaense C.DC.
 Piper nagelii C.DC.
 Piper nanayanum Trel.
 Piper napo-pastazanum Trel. & Yunck.
 Piper narinoense Yunck.
 Piper nasutum Trel.
 Piper neblinanum Yunck.
 Piper nebuligaudens Yunck.
 Piper neesianum C.DC.
 Piper neglectum Trel.
 Piper negritosense Trel.
 Piper negroense C.DC.
 Piper nematanthera C.DC.
 Piper nervulosum C.DC.
 Piper neurostachyum C.DC.
 Piper nicaraguense Callejas
 Piper nicoyanum C.DC.
 Piper nigribaccum C.DC.
 Piper nigricaule Trel.
 Piper nigriconnectivum C.DC.
 Piper nigrispicum C.DC.
 Piper nigropunctatum C.DC.
 Piper nigroramum C.DC.
 Piper nigrovirens C.DC.
 Piper nigrum L.
 Piper niteroiense Yunck.
 Piper nitidifolium C.DC.
 Piper nitidulifolium Trel.
 Piper nobile C.DC.
 Piper nodosum C.DC.
 Piper non-retrorsum Trel.
 Piper noveninervium C.DC.
 Piper novogalicianum Bornst.
 Piper novogranatense C.DC.
 Piper nubigenum (Kunth) Kunth ex Steud.
 Piper nudibaccatum Y.C.Tseng
 Piper nudifolium C.DC.
 Piper nudilimbum C.DC.
 Piper nudipedunculum C.DC.
 Piper nudiramum C.DC.
 Piper nudispicuum C.DC.
 Piper nudum C.DC.
 Piper numinica Callejas
 Piper nuncupatum Trel.

O

 Piper oaxacanum C.DC.
 Piper obaldianum C.DC.
 Piper obatense O.Schwartz
 Piper obesispicum S.Moore
 Piper obiter-sericeum Trel.
 Piper oblanceolatum Trel.
 Piper oblancifolium Yunck.
 Piper obliqueovatum Trel.
 Piper obliquum Ruiz & Pav.
 Piper oblongatifolium Trel.
 Piper oblongatilimbum Trel.
 Piper oblongatum Opiz
 Piper oblongifructum Callejas
 Piper oblongum Kunth
 Piper obovantherum C.DC.
 Piper obovatifolium Trel.
 Piper obrutum Trel. & Yunck.
 Piper obscurifolium Callejas
 Piper obsessum Trel.
 Piper obtusilimbum C.DC.
 Piper obtusissimum Miq.
 Piper obtusistigmum C.DC.
 Piper obtusum C.DC.
 Piper obumbratifolium Trel.
 Piper obumbratum (Miq.) C.DC.
 Piper occultum Trel.
 Piper ocosingosense Callejas
 Piper oculatispicum Trel.
 Piper odoratum C.DC.
 Piper offensum Trel.
 Piper okamotoi M.Hiroe
 Piper oldhamii C.DC.
 Piper ollantaitambanum Trel.
 Piper omega Trel.
 Piper onus Trel.
 Piper opacibracteum Trel.
 Piper operosum Trel.
 Piper opizianum Fürnr.
 Piper oradendron Trel. & Standl.
 Piper oreophilum Ridl.
 Piper orizabanum C.DC.
 Piper ornatispicum Trel.
 Piper ornatum N.E.Br.
 Piper ornithorhynchum Trel.
 Piper oroense Yunck.
 Piper orosianum Trel.
 Piper orthostachyum (Kunth) Kunth ex Steud.
 Piper ospinense Trel. & Yunck.
 Piper ostii Trel.
 Piper otophorum C.DC.
 Piper otto-huberi Steyerm.
 Piper ottoniifolium C.DC.
 Piper ottonoides Yunck.
 Piper ovantherum C.DC.
 Piper ovatibaccum C.DC.
 Piper ovatilimbum C.DC.
 Piper ovatistigmum C.DC.
 Piper ovatum Vahl
 Piper oviedoi Urb.
 Piper oxycarpum C.DC.
 Piper oxyphyllum C.DC.
 Piper oxystachyum C.DC.

P

 Piper pacacanum Trel.
 Piper pachoanum C.DC.
 Piper pachyarthrum K.Schum.
 Piper pachyphloium C.DC.
 Piper pachyphyllum Baker
 Piper padangense C.DC.
 Piper paganicum Trel.
 Piper palenquense Callejas
 Piper palestinanum Trel. & Yunck.
 Piper pallidibracteum C.DC.
 Piper pallididorsum Trel.
 Piper pallidifolium C.DC.
 Piper pallidilimbum C.DC.
 Piper pallidirubrum C.DC.
 Piper palmanum Trel.
 Piper palmasanum C.DC.
 Piper palmeri C.DC.
 Piper paludis Callejas
 Piper paludosum C.DC.
 Piper pamploanum Trel. & Yunck.
 Piper panamense C.DC.
 Piper pandoense Yunck.
 Piper pansamalanum C.DC.
 Piper pantjarense C.DC.
 Piper papillicarpum Trel.
 Piper papillicaule Trel. & Yunck.
 Piper papilliferum Steyerm.
 Piper papulaecaule Trel.
 Piper papulatum Trel.
 Piper paraense (Miq.) C.DC.
 Piper paraguassuanum C.DC.
 Piper paraisense Trel.
 Piper paralaevigatum Trel.
 Piper paramaribense C.DC.
 Piper paranum Yunck.
 Piper parapeltobryon Trel.
 Piper parcirameum C.DC.
 Piper parcum Trel. & Yunck.
 Piper parianum Yunck.
 Piper parmatum Dressler
 Piper parong Quisumb.
 Piper partiticuspe Trel.
 Piper parvantherum C.DC.
 Piper parvicordulatum Trel.
 Piper parvipedunculum C.DC.
 Piper parviramosum Callejas
 Piper pastasanum Diels
 Piper patens Opiz
 Piper patentifolium Trel.
 Piper patulum Bertol.
 Piper patzulinum Trel. & Standl.
 Piper paucartamboanum Trel.
 Piper paucinerve C.DC.
 Piper paucipilosum Yunck.
 Piper pauciramosum Yunck.
 Piper paucistigmum C.DC.
 Piper paulianifolium Trel.
 Piper pavasense Trel.
 Piper pavimentifolium Trel.
 Piper pavonii (Miq.) C.DC.
 Piper payanum Yunck.
 Piper pearcei Yunck.
 Piper pebasense Trel.
 Piper peculiare Trel. & Yunck.
 Piper pedicellare C.DC.
 Piper pedicellatum C.DC.
 Piper pedunculatum C.DC.
 Piper peepuloides Roxb.
 Piper pellitum C.DC.
 Piper peltatifolium C.Y.Hao, H.S.Wu & Y.H.Tan
 Piper peltatum L.
 Piper peltifolium Callejas
 Piper peltilimbum Yunck.
 Piper penangense (Miq.) C.DC.
 Piper pendens Trel.
 Piper pendentispicum Trel. & Yunck.
 Piper pendulirameum Trel. & Yunck.
 Piper pendulispicum C.DC.
 Piper pentagonum Trel.
 Piper pentandrum C.DC.
 Piper penyasense Trel. & Yunck.
 Piper peracuminatum C.DC.
 Piper perareolatum C.DC.
 Piper perbarbatum C.DC.
 Piper perbrevicaule Yunck.
 Piper perbrevispicum Yunck.
 Piper perciliatum Trel. & Yunck.
 Piper percostatum Yunck.
 Piper perditum Trel.
 Piper perenense Trel.
 Piper perfugii Trel.
 Piper pergamentifolium Trel. & Standl.
 Piper pergeniculatum Trel.
 Piper perhispidum C.DC.
 Piper perijaense Steyerm.
 Piper perinaequilongum Trel.
 Piper perlasense Yunck.
 Piper perlongipedunculum Trel. & Standl.
 Piper permolle Trel. & Yunck.
 Piper permucronatum Yunck.
 Piper perpallidum Ekman, Urb. & Trel.
 Piper perpilosum C.DC.
 Piper perpurgatum Trel.
 Piper perpusillum Callejas
 Piper perscabrifolium Yunck.
 Piper perstipulare Steyerm.
 Piper perstrigosum Yunck.
 Piper persubulatum C.DC.
 Piper pertinax Trel. & Yunck.
 Piper pertomentellum Trel. & Yunck.
 Piper pertractatum Trel.
 Piper peruligerum Trel.
 Piper pervelutinum Trel.
 Piper pervenosum C.DC.
 Piper perverrucosum Trel. & Yunck.
 Piper pervicax Trel.
 Piper pervillosum Trel.
 Piper pervulgatum Trel.
 Piper pervulsum Trel. & Yunck.
 Piper petens Trel.
 Piper petiolare C.DC.
 Piper pexum Trel.
 Piper phaeophyllum Trel. & Standl.
 Piper phalangense C.DC.
 Piper phanerolepidum Trel.
 Piper phaneropus Trel.
 Piper philippinum Miq.
 Piper philodendon Ridl.
 Piper philodendroides Standl. & Steyerm.
 Piper phuwuaense Chaveer. & Tanee
 Piper phyllostictum (Miq.) C.DC.
 Piper phytolaccifolium Opiz
 Piper picardae C.DC.
 Piper picobonitoense F.G.Coe & Bornst.
 Piper piedadesense Trel.
 Piper piedecuestanum Trel. & Yunck.
 Piper pileatum Trel.
 Piper pilgeri C.DC.
 Piper pilibracteum Trel. & Yunck.
 Piper piliovarium Yunck.
 Piper pilirameum C.DC.
 Piper pilosissimum Yunck.
 Piper pilosiusculum Opiz
 Piper pilovarium Yunck.
 Piper piluliferifolium Trel. & Yunck.
 Piper piluliferum Kunth
 Piper pinaresanum Trel. & Yunck.
 Piper pinedoana Trel.
 Piper pinetorum Standl. & Steyerm.
 Piper pingbienense Y.C.Tseng
 Piper pinguifolium C.DC.
 Piper pinoganense Trel.
 Piper pinuna-negroense Trel. & Yunck.
 Piper piojoanum Trel. & Yunck.
 Piper piresii Yunck.
 Piper piscatorum Trel. & Yunck.
 Piper pitalitoense Yunck.
 Piper pittieri C.DC.
 Piper plagiophyllum K.Schum. & Lauterb.
 Piper planadosense Trel. & Standl.
 Piper planipes Trel.
 Piper planitiei Trel. & Yunck.
 Piper platylobum Sodiro
 Piper playa-blancanum Trel.
 Piper plumanum C.DC.
 Piper plumbeicolor Trel.
 Piper plurinervosum Yunck.
 Piper poasanum C.DC.
 Piper poeppigii (Kunth) Steud.
 Piper pogonioneuron Trel. & Standl.
 Piper poiteanum Steud.
 Piper politaereum Trel.
 Piper politifolium C.DC.
 Piper politii Yunck.
 Piper politum C.DC.
 Piper polyneurum C.DC.
 Piper polysyphonum C.DC.
 Piper polytrichum C.DC.
 Piper ponapense C.DC.
 Piper ponendum Trel.
 Piper ponesheense C.DC.
 Piper ponganum Trel.
 Piper pontis Trel.
 Piper popayanense C.DC.
 Piper poporense Trel. & Yunck.
 Piper populifolium Opiz
 Piper porphyrophyllum (Lindl.) N.E.Br.
 Piper porrectum C.DC.
 Piper portobellense C.DC.
 Piper porveniricola Trel.
 Piper poscitum Trel. & Yunck.
 Piper positum Trel.
 Piper postelsianum Maxim.
 Piper posusanum Trel.
 Piper potamophilum Trel. & Yunck.
 Piper pothoides (Miq.) Wall. ex C.DC.
 Piper pothophyllum Trel.
 Piper praeacutilimbum C.DC.
 Piper praemollitum Trel.
 Piper praesagium Trel. & Yunck.
 Piper premnospicum Tebbs
 Piper prianamense C.DC.
 Piper prietoi Yunck.
 Piper prismaticum C.DC.
 Piper procerifolium C.DC.
 Piper procerum Trel.
 Piper prodigum Trel.
 Piper protracticuspidatum Trel. & Yunck.
 Piper protractispicum C.DC.
 Piper protractum C.DC.
 Piper provulgatum Trel. & Yunck.
 Piper prunifolium J.Jacq.
 Piper pseudamboinense C.DC.
 Piper pseudoacreanum Steyerm.
 Piper pseudoaduncum C.DC.
 Piper pseudoaequale Steyerm.
 Piper pseudoalbuginiferum Trel.
 Piper pseudoarboreum Yunck.
 Piper pseudoasperifolium C.DC.
 Piper pseudobarbatum C.DC.
 Piper pseudobredemeyeri Steyerm.
 Piper pseudobumbratum C.DC.
 Piper pseudocallosum Trel.
 Piper pseudocativalense Trel.
 Piper pseudodelectans Callejas
 Piper pseudodilatatum C.DC.
 Piper pseudodivulgatum Steyerm.
 Piper pseudoeucalyptifolium Trel. & Yunck.
 Piper pseudofallens Callejas
 Piper pseudofimbriulatum Trel.
 Piper pseudoflexuosum Trel.
 Piper pseudofuligineum C.DC.
 Piper pseudogaragaranum Trel.
 Piper pseudoglabrifolium Trel.
 Piper pseudogrande Yunck.
 Piper pseudohastulatum Steyerm.
 Piper pseudolanceifolium Trel.
 Piper pseudolindenii C.DC.
 Piper pseudomatico Trel.
 Piper pseudomunchanum Trel.
 Piper pseudonigrum C.DC.
 Piper pseudopedicellatum P.K.Mukh.
 Piper pseudoperbrevicaule Callejas
 Piper pseudoperfugii Callejas
 Piper pseudoperuvianum C.DC.
 Piper pseudopopayanense Trel. & Yunck.
 Piper pseudopothifolium C.DC.
 Piper pseudoschippianum Callejas
 Piper pseudovariabile Trel.
 Piper pseudoviridicaule Trel.
 Piper pseudovulgatum Steyerm.
 Piper psilophyllum C.DC.
 Piper psilorhachis C.DC.
 Piper psilostachyum Kunth
 Piper psittacorum Endl.
 Piper pterocladum C.DC.
 Piper pubarulipes C.DC.
 Piper pubens Trel.
 Piper puberulescens Trel.
 Piper puberuliciliatum Yunck.
 Piper puberulidrupum Yunck.
 Piper puberulilimbum C.DC.
 Piper puberulinerva C.DC.
 Piper puberulirameum C.DC.
 Piper puberulispicum C.DC.
 Piper puberulum (Benth.) Seem.
 Piper pubibaccum C.DC.
 Piper pubicatulum C.DC.
 Piper pubinerve C.DC.
 Piper pubinervulum C.DC.
 Piper pubiovarium Yunck.
 Piper pubipedunculum C.DC.
 Piper pubipes C.DC.
 Piper pubipetiolum C.DC.
 Piper pubirhache C.DC.
 Piper pubistipulum C.DC.
 Piper pubisubmarginalum Yunck.
 Piper pubivaginatum Steyerm.
 Piper puente-altoanum Trel.
 Piper pulchrum C.DC.
 Piper pulleanum Yunck.
 Piper pullibaccum Trel.
 Piper pullibracteatum Trel.
 Piper puncticulatum Ridl.
 Piper punctiunculatum Trel.
 Piper punctulantherum C.DC.
 Piper punctulatum Standl. & Steyerm.
 Piper puniceum Trel.
 Piper puntarenasense Callejas
 Piper puraceanum Trel. & Yunck.
 Piper purdiei C.DC.
 Piper purpusianum Trel.
 Piper purulentum Trel. & Yunck.
 Piper purusanum Yunck.
 Piper pustulatum Yunck.
 Piper pustulicaule Trel.
 Piper putumayoense Trel. & Yunck.
 Piper puyoense Yunck.
 Piper pygmaeum Yunck.
 Piper pykarahense C.DC.

Q

 Piper quadratilimbum Trel.
 Piper quadratiovarium Yunck.
 Piper quicheanum Callejas
 Piper quimirianum Trel.
 Piper quinqueangulatum Miq.
 Piper quinquenervium Warb.
 Piper quitense C.DC.

R

 Piper raapii C.DC.
 Piper rafflesii (Miq.) C.DC.
 Piper raizudoanum Trel. & Yunck.
 Piper ramirezii Callejas
 Piper ramosense Yunck.
 Piper ramosii C.DC.
 Piper rarispicum C.DC.
 Piper rarum C.DC.
 Piper rasile Trel.
 Piper recensitum Trel.
 Piper recessum R.O.Gardner
 Piper rechingeri C.DC.
 Piper recreoense Trel.
 Piper rectamentum Trel.
 Piper recuperatum Trel.
 Piper redactum Trel.
 Piper reductipes Trel.
 Piper regale C.DC.
 Piper regnellii (Miq.) C.DC.
 Piper reinwardtianum (Miq.) C.DC.
 Piper reitzii Yunck.
 Piper relaxatum Trel.
 Piper relictum Lekhak, Kambale & S.R.Yadav
 Piper rematense Trel.
 Piper remotinervium Görts
 Piper renitens (Miq.) Yunck.
 Piper reptabundum C.DC.
 Piper resalutatum Trel.
 Piper restio Trel.
 Piper restrictum Trel.
 Piper retalhuleuense Trel. & Standl.
 Piper reticulatum L.
 Piper reticulosum Opiz
 Piper retrofractum Vahl
 Piper retropilosum C.DC.
 Piper reventazonis Trel.
 Piper rhinostachyum Trel.
 Piper rhizocaule Trel.
 Piper rhodocarpum Trel.
 Piper rhododendrifolium (Kunth) Kunth ex Steud.
 Piper ribesioides Wall.
 Piper richardiifolium (Kunth) Kunth ex Steud.
 Piper ridleyi C.DC.
 Piper rigidomucronatum Callejas
 Piper riitosense Trel. & Yunck.
 Piper rinconense Trel.
 Piper rindjanense C.DC.
 Piper rindu C.DC.
 Piper riocajambrense Trel. & Yunck.
 Piper riocauchosanum Yunck.
 Piper riochiadoense Trel. & Yunck.
 Piper riodocense E.F.Guim. & Carv.-Silva
 Piper rioense Yunck.
 Piper riojanum Trel.
 Piper riomarguanum Trel. & Yunck.
 Piper rionechianum Yunck.
 Piper riozulianum Trel. & Yunck.
 Piper riparense C.DC.
 Piper ripicola C.DC.
 Piper rivi-vetusti Trel.
 Piper rivinoides (Kunth) Kunth ex Steud.
 Piper roblalense Yunck.
 Piper robleanum Trel. & Yunck.
 Piper robustipedunculum Yunck.
 Piper roemeri C.DC.
 Piper rogaguanum Trel.
 Piper ronaldii Steyerm.
 Piper roqueanum Trel.
 Piper rosei C.DC.
 Piper roseiflorum Callejas
 Piper roseovenulosum Trel.
 Piper rostratum Roxb.
 Piper rothschuhii C.DC.
 Piper rotundibaccum Trel.
 Piper rovirosae C.DC.
 Piper rubiginosum Trel.
 Piper rubramentum C.DC.
 Piper rubribaccum Trel.
 Piper rubripes Trel.
 Piper rubrospadix Trel.
 Piper rubrovenosum Rodigas
 Piper rubrum C.DC.
 Piper rude Kunth
 Piper rudgeanum (Miq.) C.DC.
 Piper rueckeri K.Schum.
 Piper rufescentibaccum C.DC.
 Piper rufibracteum C.DC.
 Piper rufinerve Opiz
 Piper rufipilum Yunck.
 Piper rufispicum C.DC.
 Piper rufum C.DC.
 Piper rugosibaccum Trel.
 Piper rugosifolium Trel.
 Piper rugosilimbum Trel.
 Piper rugosum Lam.
 Piper rukshagandhum J.Mathew
 Piper rumicifolium (Miq.) C.DC.
 Piper rumphii (Miq.) C.DC.
 Piper rupicola C.DC.
 Piper rupununianum Trel. & Yunck.
 Piper rusbyi C.DC.
 Piper rusticum Trel. & Yunck.

S

 Piper sabaletasanum Trel. & Yunck.
 Piper sabanaense Yunck.
 Piper sacchamatesense Yunck.
 Piper sagittifer Trel.
 Piper sagittifolium C.DC.
 Piper saldanhae Yunck.
 Piper salentoi Trel. & Yunck.
 Piper salgaranum Trel. & Yunck.
 Piper salicariifolium (Kunth) Kunth ex Steud.
 Piper salicifolium Vahl
 Piper salicinum Opiz
 Piper salicoides Yunck.
 Piper saloyanum Trel. & Yunck.
 Piper samanense Urb.
 Piper sambuanum C.DC.
 Piper sampaioi Yunck.
 Piper san-andresense Trel. & Yunck.
 Piper san-juananum Trel.
 Piper san-marcosanum C.DC.
 Piper san-martinense Trel. & Yunck.
 Piper san-miguelense Trel. & Yunck.
 Piper san-nicolasense Trel.
 Piper san-ramonense Trel.
 Piper san-roqueanum Trel.
 Piper san-vicentense Trel. & Yunck.
 Piper sancti-felicis Trel.
 Piper sandemanii Yunck.
 Piper sandianum C.DC.
 Piper sangorianum C.DC.
 Piper sanjuanilloense Callejas
 Piper santa-ritanum Trel.
 Piper santa-rosanum C.DC.
 Piper santae-clarae Standl. & Steyerm.
 Piper sapitense C.DC.
 Piper sapotoanum Trel.
 Piper sapotoyacuense Trel.
 Piper sararense Trel. & Yunck.
 Piper sarasinorum C.DC.
 Piper sarawakanum C.DC.
 Piper sarculatum (Trel.) Callejas
 Piper sarmentosum Roxb.
 Piper satisfactum Trel.
 Piper savagii C.DC.
 Piper savanense C.DC.
 Piper scabiosifolium Trel.
 Piper scabrellum Yunck.
 Piper scabridulicaule Trel.
 Piper scabridulilimbum Trel. & Yunck.
 Piper scabrifolium Hook. & Arn.
 Piper scabrilimbum C.DC. ex A.Schroed.
 Piper scabriseptum Trel.
 Piper scabriusculum A.Dietr.
 Piper scalariforme Trel.
 Piper scalarispicum Trel.
 Piper scalpens Trel.
 Piper scandenticaule Yunck.
 Piper scansum Trel. & Yunck.
 Piper schenckii C.DC.
 Piper schiedeanum Steud.
 Piper schippianum Trel. & Standl.
 Piper schizonephros C.DC.
 Piper schlechtendalianum C.DC.
 Piper schlechtendalii Steud.
 Piper schlechteri C.DC.
 Piper schlimii C.DC.
 Piper schmidtii Hook.f.
 Piper schottii (Miq.) C.DC.
 Piper schumannii C.DC.
 Piper schunkeanum Trel.
 Piper schuppii A.H.Gentry
 Piper schwackei C.DC.
 Piper sciaphilum C.DC.
 Piper scintillans Trel.
 Piper scleromyelum C.DC.
 Piper sclerophloeum C.DC.
 Piper scobinifolium Yunck.
 Piper scortechinii C.DC.
 Piper scutifolium Yunck.
 Piper scutilimbum C.DC.
 Piper scutispicum Trel.
 Piper sebastianum Yunck.
 Piper secundum Ruiz & Pav.
 Piper seducentifolium Trel.
 Piper selangorense C.DC.
 Piper semangkoanum C.DC.
 Piper semicordulatum Trel.
 Piper semicrudum Trel.
 Piper semiimmersum C.DC.
 Piper semimetrale C.DC.
 Piper seminervosum Trel. & Yunck.
 Piper seminitidulum Trel.
 Piper semiplenum Trel.
 Piper semitarium Trel. & Yunck.
 Piper semitransparens C.Y.Hao & Y.H.Tan
 Piper semivolubile C.DC.
 Piper semperflorens C.DC.
 Piper senporeiense Yamamoto
 Piper sepicola C.DC.
 Piper sepium C.DC.
 Piper septuplinervium (Miq.) C.DC.
 Piper sericeonervosum Trel.
 Piper serotinum Trel.
 Piper serpavillanum Trel.
 Piper serrulatum Yunck.
 Piper setebarraense E.F.Guim. & L.H.P.Costa
 Piper setigerum Trel.
 Piper setosum Trel. & Yunck.
 Piper setulosum Trel.
 Piper sibulanum C.DC.
 Piper sibunense Trel.
 Piper sierra-aroense Steyerm.
 Piper signatum Trel.
 Piper siguatepequense Trel.
 Piper silentvalleyense Ravindran, M.K.Nair & Asokan Nair
 Piper silvaense Yunck.
 Piper silvanorum Trel.
 Piper silvarum C.DC.
 Piper silvicola C.DC.
 Piper silvigaudens Yunck.
 Piper silvimontanum C.DC.
 Piper silvivagum C.DC.
 Piper simile Quisumb.
 Piper simulans Trel.
 Piper simularoideum Callejas
 Piper simulhabitans Trel.
 Piper sintenense Hatus.
 Piper sinuatifolium Trel.
 Piper sinuatispicum Trel.
 Piper sinuclausum Trel.
 Piper sinugaudens C.DC.
 Piper siquirresense Trel.
 Piper sirenasense Callejas
 Piper sivarajanii Karthik. & V.S.Kumar
 Piper skutchii Trel. & Yunck.
 Piper smitinandianum Suwanph. & Chantar.
 Piper sneidernii Yunck.
 Piper snethlagei Yunck.
 Piper sociorum Trel. & Yunck.
 Piper sodiroi C.DC.
 Piper sogerense S.Moore
 Piper sogerianum C.DC.
 Piper soledadense Trel.
 Piper solmsianum C.DC.
 Piper solutidrupum Yunck.
 Piper sonadense C.DC.
 Piper sonsonatense Standl. & S.Calderon
 Piper sororium (Miq.) C.DC.
 Piper sorsogonum C.DC.
 Piper sotae Yunck.
 Piper sotobosquense S.M.Niño & Dorr
 Piper spathelliferum Quisumb.
 Piper speratum Trel.
 Piper sperdinum C.DC.
 Piper sphaerocarpum (Griseb.) C.DC. ex C.Wright
 Piper sphaeroides C.DC.
 Piper spicilongum Trel.
 Piper spinacifolium Callejas
 Piper sprengelianum C.DC.
 Piper spruceanum C.DC.
 Piper squalipelliculum Trel.
 Piper squamuliferum C.DC.
 Piper squamulosum C.DC.
 Piper staminodiferum C.DC.
 Piper standleyi Trel.
 Piper statarium Trel. & Yunck.
 Piper steinbachii Yunck.
 Piper stellipilum (Miq.) C.DC.
 Piper stenocarpum C.DC.
 Piper stenocladophorum Trel.
 Piper stenocladum C.DC.
 Piper stenopodum C.DC.
 Piper stenostachys C.DC.
 Piper sternii Yunck.
 Piper stevensii Trel.
 Piper steyermarkii Yunck.
 Piper stileferum Yunck.
 Piper stillans Trel. & Standl.
 Piper stipitiforme C.C.Chang ex Y.C.Tseng
 Piper stipulaceum Opiz
 Piper stipulare A.C.Sm.
 Piper stipulosum Sodiro
 Piper stomachicum C.DC.
 Piper storkii Trel.
 Piper striaticaule Yunck.
 Piper striatifolium Yunck.
 Piper striatipetiolum Yunck.
 Piper strictifolium D.Monteiro & E.F.Guim.
 Piper strigillosicaule Trel.
 Piper strigillosum Trel.
 Piper strigosum Trel.
 Piper stuebelii Trel.
 Piper subaduncum Yunck.
 Piper subaequilaterum Trel.
 Piper subalbicans C.DC.
 Piper subalpinum Yunck.
 Piper subampollosum Callejas
 Piper subandinum C.DC.
 Piper subasperatum Trel.
 Piper subaspericaule C.DC.
 Piper subasperifolium Yunck.
 Piper subbullatum K.Schum. & Lauterb.
 Piper subcaniramum C.DC.
 Piper subcaudatum Trel.
 Piper subcinereum C.DC.
 Piper subconcinnum C.DC.
 Piper subcordatum (Miq.) C.DC.
 Piper subcordulatum Trel.
 Piper subcrenulatum C.DC.
 Piper subdilatatum Trel.
 Piper subdivaricatum Trel.
 Piper subduidaense Yunck.
 Piper subeburneum Trel. & Standl.
 Piper subepunctatum C.DC.
 Piper suberythrocarpum C.DC.
 Piper subexiguicaule Callejas
 Piper subfalcatum Yunck.
 Piper subflavicans Trel.
 Piper subflavispicum C.DC.
 Piper subflavum C.DC.
 Piper subfragile C.DC.
 Piper subfrutescens Trel. & Yunck.
 Piper subfuscum C.DC.
 Piper subgibbosum Callejas
 Piper subglabribracteatum C.DC.
 Piper subglabrifolium C.DC.
 Piper subglabrilimbum (Yunck.) Callejas
 Piper subglabrum C.DC.
 Piper subhirsutum Trel.
 Piper sublaevifolium Trel.
 Piper sublepidotum Yunck.
 Piper sublignosum Yunck.
 Piper sublineatum Kuntze
 Piper submolle Trel.
 Piper submultinerve C.DC.
 Piper subnitidifolium Yunck.
 Piper subnitidum C.DC.
 Piper subnudibracteum C.DC.
 Piper subnudispicum Trel.
 Piper subpatens Trel.
 Piper subpedale Trel. & Yunck.
 Piper subpenninerve Ridl.
 Piper subprostratum C.DC.
 Piper subpubibracteum C.DC.
 Piper subquadratum Trel.
 Piper subquinquenerve Trel.
 Piper subrepens Trel.
 Piper subrubrispicum C.DC.
 Piper subrugosum Yunck.
 Piper subscutatum C.DC.
 Piper subseptemnervium (Miq.) C.DC.
 Piper subsericeum Trel.
 Piper subsessilifolium C.DC.
 Piper subsessililimbum C.DC.
 Piper subsilvestre C.DC.
 Piper subsilvulanum C.DC.
 Piper substenocarpum C.DC.
 Piper substilosum Yunck.
 Piper subtomentosum Trel. & Yunck.
 Piper subtrinerve Trel.
 Piper subulatum C.DC.
 Piper subvariabile Trel.
 Piper subzhorquinense C.DC. ex Trel.
 Piper sucreense Trel. & Yunck.
 Piper suffrutescens C.DC.
 Piper suffruticosum Trel.
 Piper sugandhi Ravindran, K.N.Babu & V.G.Naik
 Piper suipigua Buch.-Ham. ex D.Don
 Piper sulcatum Blume
 Piper sulcinervosum Trel.
 Piper sumpi Trel.
 Piper sundaicum Blume
 Piper supernum Trel. & Yunck.
 Piper suratanum Trel. & Yunck.
 Piper surubresanum Trel.
 Piper swartzianum (Miq.) C.DC.
 Piper sylvaticum Roxb.
 Piper sylvestre Lour.
 Piper syringifolium Vahl

T

 Piper tabanicidum Trel.
 Piper tabernillanum Trel.
 Piper tabinense Trel.
 Piper taboganum C.DC.
 Piper tacanaense Callejas
 Piper tacananum Trel. & Standl.
 Piper tacarcunense Callejas
 Piper tacariguense Steyerm.
 Piper tachiranum Yunck.
 Piper tacticanum Trel. & Standl.
 Piper taiwanense T.T.Lin & S.Y.Lu
 Piper tajumulcoanum Trel. & Standl.
 Piper talbotii C.DC.
 Piper tamayoanum Steyerm.
 Piper tapantiense Trel.
 Piper taperanum Yunck.
 Piper taperinhanum Yunck.
 Piper tapianum Trel.
 Piper tarcolense Callejas
 Piper tardans Trel.
 Piper tectoniifolium (Kunth) Kunth ex Steud.
 Piper tecumense Trel.
 Piper tecutlanum Trel. & Standl.
 Piper telanum Trel.
 Piper telembi E.García
 Piper temiscoense Trel. ex Callejas
 Piper temptum Trel.
 Piper tenebricosum Trel.
 Piper tentatum Trel.
 Piper tenue Kunth
 Piper tenuibracteum C.DC.
 Piper tenuiculispicum Trel.
 Piper tenuicuspe (Miq.) C.DC.
 Piper tenuifolium C.DC.
 Piper tenuilimbum C.DC.
 Piper tenuimucronatum C.DC.
 Piper tenuinerve C.DC.
 Piper tenuipes C.DC.
 Piper tenuispicum C.DC.
 Piper tepicanum C.DC.
 Piper tepuiense Steyerm.
 Piper tequendanense C.DC.
 Piper terrabanum C.DC.
 Piper terryae Standl.
 Piper tesserispicum Trel.
 Piper tessmannii Trel.
 Piper teysmannii (Miq.) C.DC.
 Piper theobromifolium O.Schwartz
 Piper thermale Vahl
 Piper thomsonii (C.DC.) Hook.f.
 Piper thorelii C.DC.
 Piper tiguanum C.DC.
 Piper tilaranum Trel.
 Piper timbiquinum C.DC.
 Piper timbuchianum Trel.
 Piper timothianum A.C.Sm.
 Piper tinctum Trel.
 Piper tjambae C.DC.
 Piper tocacheanum C.DC.
 Piper tomas-albertoi Trel. & Yunck.
 Piper tomentosum Mill.
 Piper tomohonum C.DC.
 Piper tonduzii C.DC.
 Piper toppingii C.DC.
 Piper toronotepuiense Steyerm.
 Piper torresanum Trel.
 Piper torricellense Lauterb.
 Piper tortivenulosum Yunck.
 Piper tortuosipilum Trel.
 Piper tortuosivenosum Trel.
 Piper tovarense Trel. & Yunck.
 Piper townsendii C.DC.
 Piper trachydermum Trel.
 Piper trachyphyllum C.DC.
 Piper translucens Yunck.
 Piper transpontinum Trel.
 Piper travancorianum P.K.Mukh.
 Piper trianae C.DC.
 Piper triangulare Chew ex P.Royen
 Piper trichocarpon C.DC.
 Piper trichogynum C.DC.
 Piper trichoneuron (Miq.) C.DC.
 Piper trichophlebium Trel.
 Piper trichophyllum C.DC.
 Piper trichopus Trel.
 Piper trichorhachis C.DC.
 Piper trichostachyon (Miq.) C.DC.
 Piper trichostylopse Trel.
 Piper trichostylum C.DC.
 Piper tricolor Y.C.Tseng
 Piper tricuspe (Miq.) C.DC.
 Piper tridentipilum C.DC.
 Piper trigoniastrifolium C.DC.
 Piper trigonocarpum Trel.
 Piper trigonodrupum Yunck.
 Piper trigonum C.DC.
 Piper trinervium (Miq.) C.DC.
 Piper trineuron Miq.
 Piper triquetrofructum Trel.
 Piper tristemon C.DC.
 Piper tristigmum Trel.
 Piper truman-yunckeri Callejas
 Piper truncatibaccum C.DC.
 Piper truncatum Vell.
 Piper tsakianum C.DC.
 Piper tsangyuanense P.S.Chen & P.C.Zhu
 Piper tsarasotrae Papini, Palchetti, M.Gori & Rota Nodari
 Piper tsengianum M.G.Gilbert & N.H.Xia
 Piper tsuritkubense Trel.
 Piper tuberculatum Jacq.
 Piper tucumanum C.DC.
 Piper tuerckheimii C.DC.
 Piper tuisanum C.DC.
 Piper tumidinodum Yunck.
 Piper tumidipedunculum Trel.
 Piper tumidonodosum P.K.Mukh.
 Piper tumidum Kunth
 Piper tumupasense Yunck.
 Piper tungurahuae Sodiro
 Piper tuquesanum Callejas
 Piper turbense Trel.
 Piper turrialvanum C.DC.
 Piper tutuilae C.DC.
 Piper tuxtepecense Trel. ex Callejas
 Piper tuxtlense Callejas

U

 Piper uaupesense Yunck.
 Piper ubiqueasperum Trel.
 Piper ubiquescabridum Trel.
 Piper ucayalianum Trel.
 Piper udicola C.DC.
 Piper udimontanum C.DC.
 Piper uhdei C.DC.
 Piper ulceratum Trel.
 Piper uleanum Trel.
 Piper ulei C.DC.
 Piper ulvifolium K.Schum. & Lauterb.
 Piper umbellatum L.
 Piper umbricola C.DC.
 Piper umbriculum (Cuatrec.) M.A.Jaram. & Callejas
 Piper umbriense Trel. & Yunck.
 Piper umbrosum Kunth
 Piper uncinulatum Ridl.
 Piper ungaramense C.DC.
 Piper unguiculatum Ruiz & Pav.
 Piper unguiculiferum Trel.
 Piper unillanum Trel. & Yunck.
 Piper upalaense Callejas
 Piper urdanetanum C.DC.
 Piper urense Callejas
 Piper urophyllum C.DC.
 Piper urostachyum Hemsl.
 Piper urubambanum Trel.
 Piper uspantanense C.DC.
 Piper usumacintense Lundell
 Piper utinganum Yunck.
 Piper uvitanum C.DC.

V

 Piper vaccinum Standl. & Steyerm.
 Piper vaginans C.DC.
 Piper valdivianum Callejas
 Piper valetudinarii Trel.
 Piper valladolidense Yunck.
 Piper vallicola C.DC.
 Piper vanderveldeanum Trel.
 Piper varablancanum Trel.
 Piper variabile C.DC.
 Piper varibracteum C.DC.
 Piper variifolium (Miq.) C.DC.
 Piper variipilum C.DC.
 Piper variitrichum Yunck.
 Piper vellosoi Yunck.
 Piper velutinervium C.DC.
 Piper velutinibaccum C.DC.
 Piper velutininervosum Trel.
 Piper velutinobracteosum Callejas
 Piper velutinovarium C.DC.
 Piper velutinum Kunth
 Piper venamoense Steyerm.
 Piper veneralense Trel. & Yunck.
 Piper venosum (Miq.) C.DC.
 Piper ventoleranum Trel.
 Piper venulosissimum Yunck.
 Piper veraguanum Callejas
 Piper veraguense C.DC.
 Piper verbascifolium (Miq.) C.DC.
 Piper verbenanum C.DC.
 Piper veredianum Trel.
 Piper vergelense Trel. & Standl.
 Piper vermiculatum C.DC.
 Piper verruculicaule Trel.
 Piper verruculifolium Trel.
 Piper verruculigerum Trel.
 Piper verruculipetiolum Trel.
 Piper verruculosum C.DC.
 Piper versteegii C.DC.
 Piper vestitifolium C.DC.
 Piper vestitum C.DC.
 Piper vexans Trel.
 Piper via-chicoense Yunck.
 Piper viae-marginis Trel.
 Piper vicinum Trel.
 Piper vicosanum Yunck.
 Piper victorianum C.DC.
 Piper villalobosense Yunck.
 Piper villarrealii Yunck.
 Piper villipedunculum C.DC.
 Piper villirameum C.DC.
 Piper villiramulum C.DC.
 Piper villistipulum Trel.
 Piper villosispicum Trel.
 Piper villosissimum Yunck.
 Piper villosum C.DC.
 Piper viminifolium Trel.
 Piper virgatum Yunck.
 Piper virgenense Trel. & Yunck.
 Piper virginicum Trel. & Standl.
 Piper virgultorum C.DC.
 Piper viridescens Suwanph. & Chantar.
 Piper viridicaule Trel.
 Piper viridifolium Trel.
 Piper viridilimbum Trel.
 Piper viridistachyum Yunck.
 Piper virillanum C.DC.
 Piper viscaianum Trel. & Yunck.
 Piper vitabile Trel.
 Piper vitaceum Yunck.
 Piper viticaule Yunck.
 Piper vitiense A.C.Sm.
 Piper voigtii C.DC.
 Piper volubile C.DC.

W

 Piper wabagense W.L.Chew
 Piper wachenheimii Trel.
 Piper wagneri C.DC.
 Piper walkeri Miq.
 Piper wallichii (Miq.) Hand.-Mazz.
 Piper wangii M.G.Gilbert & N.H.Xia
 Piper weddellii C.DC.
 Piper wedelii Yunck.
 Piper wibomii Yunck.
 Piper wichmannii C.DC.
 Piper wightii Miq.
 Piper wilhelmense Chew ex P.Royen
 Piper wilsonii Trel.
 Piper wingfieldii Steyerm.
 Piper winkleri C.DC.
 Piper woytkowskii Yunck.
 Piper wrightii C.DC.

X

 Piper xanthocarpum C.DC.
 Piper xanthoneurum Trel.
 Piper xanthostachyum C.DC.
 Piper xiroresanum C.DC.
 Piper xylosteoides (Kunth) Steud.

Y

 Piper yamaranguilaense Callejas
 Piper yanaconasense Trel. & Yunck.
 Piper yananoanum Trel.
 Piper yaracuyense Yunck.
 Piper yaxhanum Trel.
 Piper yessupianum Trel.
 Piper yinkiangense Y.C.Tseng
 Piper yoroanum Trel.
 Piper yousei Trel.
 Piper yucatanense C.DC.
 Piper yui M.G.Gilbert & N.H.Xia
 Piper yungasanum Yunck.
 Piper yunnanense Y.C.Tseng
 Piper yzabalanum C.DC.

Z

 Piper zacapanum Trel. & Standl.
 Piper zacatense C.DC.
 Piper zarceroense Trel.
 Piper zarumanum Trel.
 Piper zentanum C.DC.
 Piper zeylanicum Miq.
 Piper zhorquinense C.DC.
 Piper zollingeri C.DC.
 Piper zonulatispicum Trel.

References

List
Piper